James Stothert (7 April 1870 – after 1895) was an English footballer who played in The Football League for Blackburn Rovers, Lincoln City and Notts County.

Early Career 
In 1887 aged 16/17 Stothert signed as a youth player for a club called Braeside F.C. There are no records available for this club but Braeside is a district of Blackburn. Stothert moved to another Blackburn club in 1887, Bohemians F.C. (Again no records available. He joined Blackburn Rovers in 1888.

1888-1889
When key Blackburn Rovers player Harry Fecitt was unavailable to play in the home match against Bolton Wanderers on 8 December 1888, Rovers decided to draft in Bohemians (Blackburn) player James Stothert at Inside-Left. According to Cricket and Football Field James Stothert was not on the pitch when the match started. In fact, Rovers led Wanderers 2-0 when he came onto the pitch. Stothert appeared to have a negative impact on the Rovers team as within minutes of coming on Wanderers made it 1–2. At half-time it was 2-2. Stothert' negative impact continued into the 2nd half. He missed an open goal much to the displeasure of the Rovers crowd. Then Wanderers made it 4–2. Stothert redeemed himself by scoring to bring Rovers' back to 3–4. Rover's snatched a point with a 4th goal right at the end of the match.

References

1870 births
Year of death missing
Footballers from Blackburn
English footballers
Association football fullbacks
Association football wing halves
Blackburn Rovers F.C. players
Lincoln City F.C. players
Notts County F.C. players
Bacup Borough F.C. players
Barnsley F.C. players
Crewe Alexandra F.C. players
English Football League players
Place of death missing